Devineni Nehru (born Devineni Rajasekhar; 22 June 1954 – 17 April 2017) represented Kankipadu Assembly Constituency in Krishna District of the Indian state of Andhra Pradesh.

Life 

Nehru was born on 22 June 1954 in Vijayawada. He received B.A. degree from S.R.R & C.V.R college, Vijayawada. His first career was in agriculture. He is the son of Sri D. Rama Krishna Vara Prasad. He married Smt. Devineni Lakshmi. They have a daughter Kranthi and a son 21, Devineni Avinash.

Career 

Rajasekhar served as a Minister (1994–96) in the cabinet of late Chief Minister NTR's TDP Government. Rajasekhar won five terms (1983, 1985, 1989, 1994 and 2004) as an MLA from Kankipadu Assembly Constituency. He stood for the 2009 and 2014 elections but was defeated in both. In 2009 he lost against Telugu cinema actor Chiranjeevi 's Praja Rajyam Party and in 2014 he got only 13,497 votes (7%). He later rejoined Telugu Desam Party.

Death 
He died of cardiac arrest on 17 April 2017 at his house in Hyderabad.

References

8. https://timesofindia.indiatimes.com/city/vijayawada/devineni-rajasekhar-the-nehru-who-dominated-krishna-district-politics-for-3-decades/articleshow/58219034.cms

1954 births
2017 deaths
Telugu Desam Party politicians
People from Krishna district
Politicians from Vijayawada
20th-century Indian politicians
Members of the Andhra Pradesh Legislative Assembly